Carlo Arrighi (24 September 1947) is an Italian long jumper who was a three-time finalist at the European Championships.

Career
His  personal best, 7.87m set in 1972 was the 30th best result in the year world top-lists.

Achievements

National titles
Arrighi won four national championships at individual senior level.

Italian Athletics Indoor Championships
Long jump: 1971, 1973, 1977, 1978 (4)

References

External links
 

1947 births
Italian male long jumpers
Sportspeople from the Province of Massa-Carrara
Athletics competitors of Centro Sportivo Carabinieri
Living people
People from Carrara